Gabriela Jasińska (born ) is a Polish volleyball player. She is part of the Poland women's national volleyball team.

She participated in the 2014 FIVB Volleyball World Grand Prix.
On club level she played for Polski Cukier Muszynianka Fakr in 2014.

References

External links
 Profile at FIVB.org

1992 births
Living people
Polish women's volleyball players
Sportspeople from Szczecin